Parnasala is a monument in the shape of a full bloomed lotus in white marble, located at Santhigiri Ashram, 21 km from Kerala's capital Thiruvananthapuram. The monument is at the final resting place of Navajyothisree Karunakara Guru (1927–99), the founder of Santhigiri Ashram.

The Parnasala, which rises to a height of 91 ft., was inaugurated by the then President of India, Pratibha Devisingh Patil, on 13 August 2010. It was opened for public 12 September 2010.

History and significance 
Navajyothisree Karunakara Guru was born on 1 September 1927, in a simple family in Chandiroor village in the Alappuzha district of Kerala. Named Karunakaran by his parents, he was a quiet, contemplative boy who his followers believe received mystical experiences since childhood. He left home at the age of 14 years to lead a monastic life. After serving in Varkala-based Sivagiri Mutt and its various institutions for 17 years, Guru, by then known as Karunakara Swami, moved to live permanently at Pothencode in 1968. The first form of the Guru’s ‘Parnasala’ (hermitage) was that of a thatched roof supported by four tapioca stems. In the 1970s, this simple structure was converted into a one-room tenement with a tiled roof. It was in these austere environs that Guru lived and daily met the people who thronged the simple hermitage looking for solutions to everyday problems, including chronic ailments, or in search of higher truths. After the Guru’s death on 6 May 1999, his followers interred his body in the Parnasala and raised it as a monument.

The foundation stone for the Lotus Parnasala was placed by Sishyapoojitha Amritha Jnana Thapaswini, the foremost disciple of Guru and his spiritual successor, on 17 November 1999. The construction work went on uninterrupted for ten years, backed by the unstinted prayers and support of the Guru’s disciples and followers in different parts of the world such as the late former President of India, Sri K.R. Narayanan and noted author, Sri O.V. Vijayan

A lamp lit by Guru when he established the Ashram, has been kept burning ever since and is placed inside the Parnasala, which symbolises the Guru’s life and message of universal peace, spirituality and fraternity propagated through a Guru-Disciple order.

Design and dimensions 
The Parnasala is not designed by a professional architect. Its shape and structure were conceived by the head of Santhigiri Ashram,  Sishyapoojitha Amritha Jnana Thapaswini, in inner visions. Nearly 100,000 Sq. Ft. of the milky white marble was specially mined at Makrana in Rajasthan and transported to Santhigiri Ashram for the Parnasala. The world-famous Makrana marble has been the stone of choice for use in renowned monuments such as the Taj Mahal. Black granite was specially mined in Chamrajnagar district in Karnataka for the Parnasala.
The Parnasala consists of 21 marble overlaid petals supported on 21 pillars. While 12 petals, signifying the 12 zodiac divisions, are located in the upper layer, 9 petals, signifying the 9 planets, unfurl in the lower layer. Similarly, there are nine inner and 12 outer pillars. There is a passage for the movement of devotees between the inner and outer pillars.
At the heart of the Parnasala is a cubicle in the shape of a lotus bud, which is carved out of teak wood and has the inner walls encased in brass plates. The Guru’s sacred body has been placed in a marble casket inside this wooden sanctum. A life-size image of Guru, sculpted in gold, has been placed in the sanctum atop a platform made of black granite. Eleven steps, also made of black granite, lead to the platform.
The Parnasala rises to a height of 91 ft. and is 84 ft wide. The inner circle has a width of 64 ft. The 12 upward petals measure 41 ft. each while the 9 downward petals measure 31 ft. The teak wood sanctum has a height of 27 feet and 21 ft. diameter. A parasol with a diameter of 36 ft. shades over the sanctum. In front of the sanctum is a ceremonial platform with intricate wooden carvings and artwork.

Dedication and opening ceremonies 
The Lotus Parnasala was formally dedicated to humanity by the President of India, Pratibha Devisingh Patil, at a special function at Santhigiri Ashram on 13 August 2010. Kerala's Governor, Sri R. S. Gavai, presided over the function, which was also attended by Kerala's Home Minister, Sri Kodiyeri Balakrishnan and Member of Parliament Shashi Tharoor.
Speaking on the occasion, the President described Navajyothisree Karunakara Guru as a great visionary who believed in a casteless society based on strong family values. The lotus-shaped Parnasala is a befitting tribute to the Guru, who always said the religion he believed is that of love, tolerance and fraternity, she added.

Parnasala dedication programmes 
The President also inaugurated a month-long Parnasala Dedication Celebration which included events such as an ‘International Conference on Global Warming, Climate Change, Sustainable Development and Secular Spirituality, which was inaugurated by the President of East Timor and the 1996 Nobel Peace Laureate, Mr. Jose Ramos-Horta.
Other events included a ‘National Spiritual Congress’, an Arts and Cultural Festival called ‘Kalanjali’, a national products and crafts exhibition called ‘Santhigiri Expo’, ‘Edu. Fest’ for school and college students, a Middle East Health and Research Seminar and a Media Seminar.

Opening day 
‘Prakashathinte Divasam’ (The Day of the Supreme Light) was celebrated by Santhigiri Ashram on 12 September 2010, the 84th birthday of Navajyothisree Karunakara Guru, to mark the opening of the Parnasala for public worship by Sishyapoojitha Amritha Jnana Thapaswini. India’s Defence Minister, A. K. Antony, was the first national leader to offer flowers in the monument on that day [15].

References

External links

 

Buildings and structures in Thiruvananthapuram district
Monuments and memorials in Kerala